Jesingpura is a village in the Tapi district of Gujarat and is located on the road connecting the Tapi district headquarters Vyara and the Ukai.

References

Villages in Tapi district